The Charles Mingus Quintet & Max Roach is an album by Charles Mingus, recorded at the Café Bohemia in December 1955 and released in 1964. Max Roach makes a guest appearance on two tracks. Other material from the concert were released on the album Mingus at the Bohemia in 1956.

Reception 
In his review for AllMusic, Ron Wynn stated: "The Mingus/Roach/Mal Waldron dialogs overcome the ordinary stylings of Eddie Bert and George Barrow."

Track listing 
 "A Foggy Day" (George Gershwin, Ira Gershwin) - 5:36
 "Drums" (Charles Mingus, Max Roach) - 5:38
 "Haitian Fight Song" (Mingus) -  5:27
 "Lady Bird" (Tadd Dameron) - 5:58
 "I'll Remember April" (Gene de Paul, Patricia Johnston, Don Raye) - 13:13
 "Love Chant" (Mingus) - 7:26
The actual melody of "I'll Remember April" is not played

Personnel 
 George Barrow - tenor sax
 Eddie Bert - trombone
 Mal Waldron - piano
 Charles Mingus - bass 
 Willie Jones - drums (except 5)
 Max Roach - drums (tracks 2 and 5)

References 

1955 live albums
America Records live albums
Charles Mingus live albums
Debut Records live albums
Albums recorded at the Café Bohemia